San Blas Atempa  is a town and municipality in Oaxaca in south-western Mexico.

It is part of the Tehuantepec District in the west of the Istmo Region.

As of 2005, the municipality had a total population of 16,899.

References

Municipalities of Oaxaca